Joseph Drummond Chandler (18 September 1877 – 18 October 1966) was an  Australian rules footballer who played with South Melbourne in the Victorian Football League (VFL).

Notes

External links 

1877 births
1966 deaths
Australian rules footballers from Melbourne
Sydney Swans players
People from North Melbourne